Thibaudeau Rinfret  (June 22, 1879 – July 25, 1962) was a Canadian jurist and the ninth Chief Justice of Canada and Administrator of Canada in 1952.

Early life
Rinfret was born in Montreal in 1879, the son of François-Olivier Rinfret and Albina Pominville. He was the brother of Fernand Rinfret, Liberal politician who became Mayor of Montreal, and brother of Charles Rinfret, a prominent Montreal businessman.

Professional career
Rinfret studied law at the Université Laval à Montréal, Faculté de droit and McGill University and was called to the Bar of Quebec in 1901. He was appointed to the Quebec Superior Court in 1922 and to the Supreme Court of Canada in 1924.

Rinfret became Chief Justice on January 8, 1944, and served until his retirement on June 22, 1954. During his term as Chief Justice, Canada ended appeals to the Judicial Committee of the Privy Council making the Supreme Court of Canada the final court of appeal in Canadian jurisprudence.

Rinfret was Administrator of the Government in 1952 after the departure of Harold Alexander, 1st Earl Alexander of Tunis, and until Vincent Massey could officially be sworn in as Governor General of Canada. During this time he proclaimed Elizabeth II as Queen of Canada, following the death of King George VI.

Personal life 
His son was the Quebec politician and judge Édouard Rinfret.

Electoral record

References

External links
 Supreme Court of Canada Biography
 

1879 births
1962 deaths
Chief justices of Canada
Governors General of Canada
Lawyers in Quebec
McGill University alumni
Université de Montréal Faculty of Law alumni
McGill University Faculty of Law alumni
Canadian members of the Privy Council of the United Kingdom
Members of the King's Privy Council for Canada
Grand Officiers of the Légion d'honneur
Canadian King's Counsel
Knights Grand Cross of the Order of St Gregory the Great
Members of the Judicial Committee of the Privy Council
Université Laval alumni